The Little Carib Theatre (LCT) was established in Woodbrook, Port of Spain, Trinidad, in 1947 by Beryl McBurnie "to showcase the vibrant and rich culture of the Trinbagonian people". The first permanent folk-dance company and theatre in Trinidad, it has been described as "the mecca of West Indian folk dance". It remains the only dance theatre of its kind in the region.

History
The Little Carib Theatre was formally opened in November 1948. The foundation stone was laid by Paul Robeson, who at the time was visiting Trinidad, and whom the founder Beryl McBurnie had met in New York.

By the 1960s, the work of the Little Carib Dance Company had been recognised and celebrated overseas, having performed at such events as the Caribbean Festival of Arts in Puerto Rico in 1952, the Jamaica Tercentenary Celebrations in 1955 and the opening of the Federal Parliament of Toronto in April 1958. The Little Carib building had to be demolished in the 1960s, and it was rebuilt in three years.

Many of the plays of Nobel Prize-winner Derek Walcott were first staged at the Little Carib Theatre, where he held weekly theatre workshops as founding director, from 1959 to 1971, of what became the Trinidad Theatre Workshop.

References

Further reading
 Molly Ahye, Cradle of Caribbean Dance: Beryl McBurnie and the Little Carib Theatre, Heritage Cultures, 1983.

External links
 About The Little Carib Theatre.
 The Little Carib Theatre on Facebook.

Afro–Trinidadian and Tobagonian culture
Arts organizations established in 1948
Theatre in Trinidad and Tobago
Theatres completed in 1948
Trinidad and Tobago culture